Ainie Knight (born 24 May 1986) is a Philippines international lawn and indoor bowler.

Biography
Knight from Sagay, Negros Occidental, in the Philippines won a bronze medal in the pairs at the 2012 World Outdoor Bowls Championship in Adelaide.

She has won three medals in the pairs at the Asia Pacific Bowls Championships. In 2014, she won the Hong Kong International Bowls Classic pairs title with Sonia Bruce.

In 2020 she was selected for the 2020 World Outdoor Bowls Championship in Australia.

References 

1987 births
Living people
Filipino female lawn bowls players
Sportspeople from Negros Occidental
Southeast Asian Games medalists in lawn bowls
Southeast Asian Games bronze medalists for the Philippines
Competitors at the 2007 Southeast Asian Games
Competitors at the 2017 Southeast Asian Games
Southeast Asian Games silver medalists for the Philippines
Competitors at the 2019 Southeast Asian Games